Samuel F. "Sam" Pickering Jr. (born September 30, 1941) is a writer and professor emeritus of English at the University of Connecticut in Storrs. His unconventional teaching style was an inspiration for the character of Mr. Keating, played by Robin Williams in the film Dead Poets Society. Pickering specializes in the familiar essay, children's literature, nature writers, and 18th and 19th century English literature. Pickering has published many collections of non-fiction personal essays as well as over 200 articles.

Life
Samuel Pickering was born and raised in Nashville, Tennessee, where he attended Montgomery Bell Academy. He received his Bachelor of Arts degree (B.A.) from the University of the South and a second B.A. from St Catharine's College, Cambridge.  He briefly returned to his alma mater, Montgomery Bell, to teach, a year before attending graduate school, receiving a Master of Arts degree (M.A.) at St Catharine's. He attained a second M.A. and a Doctor of Philosophy degree (Ph.D.) from Princeton University. In addition, he was awarded an honorary Doctor of Letters degree from Oglethorpe University in 2002.

Career
One of Pickering's students at Montgomery Bell Academy, Tom Schulman, later wrote the script for the film Dead Poets Society, basing the pedagogy of Robin Williams' character very loosely on Pickering's eccentric style. Pickering has eschewed publicity raised by the film and has since regarded the unorthodoxy of his classroom behavior as more goalless than that depicted in Dead Poets Society, in which unorthodoxy is employed deliberately as a way to preach the values of non-conformity and carpe diem. Instead, Pickering has commented that "I did such things not so much to awaken students as to entertain myself." Pickering has often considered his teaching style purely purposeless and impulsive, and he criticizes those who have subsequently asked him about his philosophy on education, responding that people, regarding such large social questions, have trouble with "the realization that mostly it's all meaningless. I don't know why people want answers."

Pickering's writing has been characterized as equally sporadic, meandering, and amusing, with a common teaching and writing guideline of "You have to lie to give the illusion of the truth." His non-fiction work typically takes a humorous tone and revolves around the everyday absurdities and pretensions of civilization. Regarding his writing process, Pickering has said:

Pickering was an assistant professor at Dartmouth College from 1970–1978, associate professor at the University of Connecticut from 1978-1984, and has been a professor at the University of Connecticut since 1984. A Fulbright recipient, Pickering has lectured in classrooms in Jordan and Syria, and has held research posts at the University of Western Australia as well as the University of Edinburgh. Since the end of 2013, Pickering has been titled "professor emeritus" on the University of Connecticut's website.

Bibliography

 
 
 Children’s Literature. Vols. 8-10 (co-editor, 1979–81)

See also
 Dead Poets Society
 Inspirational/motivational instructors/mentors portrayed in films
 2002, Honorary degree in Doctor of Letters from Oglethorpe University

References

External links
 Pickering's resumé
 Pickering's Biography

Pickering, Samuel F Jr
Pickering, Samuel F Jr
Princeton University alumni
People from Nashville, Tennessee
University of Connecticut faculty
1941 births
Pickering, Samuel F Jr
Alumni of St Catharine's College, Cambridge
Sewanee: The University of the South alumni
Fulbright alumni